Mary Jane Girls is the eponymous debut album released by girl group the Mary Jane Girls on the Gordy record label on April 13, 1983. It peaked at number 56 on the Billboard 200 chart.

The album was produced and written entirely by Rick James. Three singles were released and each enjoyed success on the Hot Black Singles charts: "Candy Man" (number 23 R&B), "All Night Long" (number 11 R&B), and "Boys" (number 29 R&B). All three songs charted together on the Hot Dance Club Play chart, peaking at number 8.

Track listing
All songs written and composed by Rick James.

"Candy Man" (4:39)
"Boys" (5:34)
"Prove It" (4:28)
"Jealousy" (3:28)
"You Are My Heaven" (3:14)
"On the Inside" (3:55)
"All Night Long" (5:34)
"Musical Love" (5:07)

Personnel
Joanne "Jojo" McDuffie – lead and backing vocals
The Waters Sisters – background vocals
Rick James – drums, guitar, bass, synthesizer, percussion, sitar, timpani
 Levi Ruffin, Jr. – synthesizer, synth strings, Fender Rhodes, backing vocals 
Greg "Bubbles" Levias – synthesizer, Fender Rhodes, organ
Danny LeMelle – saxophone, wind controller, synth strings, percussion
Oscar Alston – synth bass
Tom McDermott –  lead guitar
Alan McGrier –  bass
Steve Price, Tony Nolasco – percussion
LaMorris Payne – backing vocals

Charts

Weekly charts

Year-end charts

Singles

Samples
 "All Night Long" has been sampled in many songs, including "Smooth Operator" by Big Daddy Kane on his 1989 LP, It's a Big Daddy Thing, "Around the Way Girl" by LL Cool J, "Tonight's da Night" by Redman and "Mary Jane (All Night Long)" by Mary J. Blige, Da Bitchez by Jeru The Damaja, Can't Wait by Redman.
 Kylie Minogue sampled "Candy Man" in "Always Find the Time" from her hit album, Rhythm of Love.

References

External links
 Mary Jane Girls-Mary Jane Girls at Discogs

1983 debut albums
Mary Jane Girls albums
Albums produced by Rick James
Gordy Records albums